The Lola T950 is an open-wheel race car chassis, designed, developed and built by Lola Cars, for Formula 3000 racing, in 1985.

References 

Open wheel racing cars
Lola racing cars